Songs of Italy (Italian: Canzoni di tutta Italia) is a 1955 Italian musical film directed by Domenico Paolella and starring Marco Vicario, Rossana Podestà and Silvana Pampanini.

It was shot in Ferraniacolor. It was one of several musicarello directed by Paolella.

Cast
 Marco Vicario 
 Rossana Podestà 
 Silvana Pampanini
 Fausto Tozzi 
 Anna Maria Ferrero 
 Tamara Lees 
 Giorgio De Lullo 
 Dante Maggio 
 Irène Galter
 Lyla Rocco 
 Roberto Risso 
 Carlo Sposito
 Armida De Pasquali 
 Italia Dini 
 Sandra Francis 
 Gisella Monaldi 
 Mercedes Mozart

References

Bibliography
 Anna Maria Torriglia. Broken Time, Fragmented Space: A Cultural Map for Postwar Italy. University of Toronto Press, 2002.

External links

1955 films
1955 musical films
Italian musical films
1950s Italian-language films
Films directed by Domenico Paolella
Films scored by Carlo Rustichelli
Musicarelli
1950s Italian films